Ixtenco Otomi, also known as Tlaxcala Otomi, is a native American language spoken in the town of San Juan Bautista Ixtenco in the state of Tlaxcala, Mexico. It has been classified as Eastern Otomi by Lastra (2006). Lastra considers Ixtenco Otomí to be a very conservative dialect.

In Tlaxcala, Otomí was also formerly spoken in nearby Huamantla, located to the north (Carrasco 1950). To the east, it was spoken in Nopaluca, San Salvador el Seco, and Cuapiaxtla. Some families from Ixtenco have migrated to Máximo Serdán in Rafael Lara Grajales, Puebla (Lastra 1998).

Notes

Sources 
Lastra, Yolanda. 1998. Ixtenco Otomi. Munich: LINCOM EUROPA.
 

Otomi language
Endangered Oto-Manguean languages
Languages of Mexico
Oto-Manguean languages